José Timoteo Martínez Pérez (born 22 December 1956) is a Mexican politician from the institutional Revolutionary Party. From 2000 to 2003 he served as Deputy of the LVIII Legislature of the Mexican Congress representing Querétaro. He also served as municipal president of San Joaquín, Querétaro from 1991 to 1994.

References

1956 births
Living people
Politicians from Querétaro
Institutional Revolutionary Party politicians
20th-century Mexican politicians
21st-century Mexican politicians
Municipal presidents in Querétaro
Deputies of the LVIII Legislature of Mexico
Members of the Chamber of Deputies (Mexico) for Querétaro